Domentius II (Domenti II) was a Georgian churchman and the Catholicos Patriarch of Georgia who presided over the Georgian Orthodox Church from  1595 to 1610. Like his predecessors, Domentius pushed for the efforts to aggrandize the church's land properties and restore the holdings that had earlier been lost to secular noble landlords. Some historians such as Kalistrate Salia consider this Domentius to have been the same person as the earlier Catholicos Domentius I, who might have occupied his office twice, with a significant gap of nearly four decades.

References 

|-

Catholicoses and Patriarchs of Georgia (country)
16th-century people from Georgia (country)
17th-century people from Georgia (country)